Wetterau I is an electoral constituency (German: Wahlkreis) represented in the Bundestag. It elects one member via first-past-the-post voting. Under the current constituency numbering system, it is designated as constituency 177. It is located in central Hesse, comprising most of the Wetteraukreis district.

Wetterau I was created for the inaugural 1949 federal election. Since 2021, it has been represented by Natalie Pawlik of the Social Democratic Party (SPD).

Geography
Wetterau I is located in central Hesse. As of the 2021 federal election, it comprises the entirety of the Wetteraukreis district excluding the municipalities of Altenstadt, Büdingen, Gedern, Glauburg, Hirzenhain, Kefenrod, Limeshain, and Ortenberg.

History
Wetterau I was created in 1949, then known as Friedberg. In the 1976 through 2009 elections, it was named Wetterau. It acquired its current name in the 2013 election. In the 1949 election, it was Hesse constituency 11 in the numbering system. From 1953 through 1976, it was number 136. From 1980 through 1998, it was number 134. In the 2002 and 2005 elections, it was number 178. Since the 2009 election, it has been number 177.

Originally, the constituency comprised the districts of Büdingen and Friedberg. From 1976 through 1998, it was coterminous with the Wetteraukreis district. In the 2002 through 2009 elections, it comprised the Wetteraukreis district and the municipalities of Bad Soden-Salmünster, Brachttal, and Wächtersbach from the Main-Kinzig-Kreis district. It acquired its current borders in the 2013 election.

Members
The constituency was first represented by Wilhelm Knothe of the Social Democratic Party (SPD) from 1949 until his death in 1952. Fellow party member Kurt Moosdorf won the subsequent by-election, but Willi Richter replaced him as SPD candidate and representative in the 1953 federal election. Richter was succeeded by Lucie Beyer in 1957. Georg Schlaga then served from 1969 to 1983. Christian Schwarz-Schilling of the Christian Democratic Union (CDU) was elected in 1983 and was representative until 1998. Nina Hauer won the constituency for the SPD in 1998 and served three terms. Lucia Puttrich of the CDU was then representative from 2009 to 2013. Oswin Veith was elected in 2013 and re-elected in 2017. He resigned in March 2020 to become chairman of Oberhessische Versorgungsbetriebe (OVAG). Natalie Pawlik was elected for the SPD in 2021.

Election results

2021 election

2017 election

2013 election

2009 election

Notes

References

Federal electoral districts in Hesse
1949 establishments in West Germany
Constituencies established in 1949
Wetteraukreis